Walter Edward Lynch (April 15, 1897 – December 21, 1976), nicknamed "Jabber", was a catcher in Major League Baseball who played briefly for the Boston Red Sox during the  season. A native of Buffalo, New York, he studied at Niagara University and State University of New York College at Cortland.

In a three-game-career, Lynch was .500 hitter (1-for-2) and scored a run. As a catcher, he did not commit an error in two chances for a 1.000 fielding percentage.

Lynch died in Daytona Beach, Florida at age 79.

See also
1922 Boston Red Sox season

External links

Retrosheet

Boston Red Sox players
Major League Baseball catchers
Niagara Purple Eagles baseball players
Baseball players from Buffalo, New York
Cortland Red Dragons baseball players
1897 births
1976 deaths
Outremont Canadiens players
American expatriate baseball players in Canada
Burials in New York (state)